Jules Pommery  (born 22 January 2001) is a French athlete who competes in the long jump.

Career
Pommery competed at the 2019 European Athletics U20 Championships in Borås, Sweden. He won the long jump with a personal best 7.83m.

At the 2022 European Athletics Championships in Munich,  Pommery initially was given fourth place on count-back after a jump of 8.06m but following a protest from the French Federation a previous jump by British jumper and silver medalist Jacob Fincham-Dukes was ruled illegal and relegated him to fifth place and promoted Pommery to third after the event. It was the second time Pommery had ever leapt over 8 metres after previously setting a personal best of 8.17m in May, 2022 in Athens, Greece, a mark that was a new French U23 record.

References

External links

2001 births
Living people
French male long jumpers
European Athletics Championships medalists
21st-century French people